The Moar Mound and Village Site is an archaeological site in the southwestern part of the U.S. state of Ohio. One of the few remaining mounds in southern Warren County, the Moar Mound has been very well preserved from deterioration.

Believed to be the work of Late Woodland peoples, the mound is believed to be the burial location for one or more individuals and a range of grave goods.  It is likely associated directly with the adjacent village, from which multiple burials have been recovered.  Archaeological excavations of the village site have yielded a wide range of artifacts, making the Moar Mound and Village Site one of Warren County's premier archaeological sites.

In 1976, the Moar Mound and Village Site were listed together on the National Register of Historic Places.  Key to this designation as a historic site was their potential to yield archaeological information about the peoples that built the mound and lived in the village.

References

Archaeological sites on the National Register of Historic Places in Ohio
National Register of Historic Places in Warren County, Ohio
Woodland period
Mounds in Ohio
Historic districts on the National Register of Historic Places in Ohio